The Executive Council of the North West is the cabinet of the executive branch of the provincial government in the South African province of the North West. The Members of the Executive Council (MECs) are appointed from among the members of the North West Provincial Legislature by the Premier of the North West, an office held since September 2021 by Bushy Maape of the African National Congress (ANC).

Molewa premiership: 2004–2009 
Pursuant to the 2004 general election, Edna Molewa was elected Premier of the North West; she announced her Executive Council on 30 April 2004. On 23 August 2005, Molewa announced a reshuffle in which no MECs were fired but most changed positions; the reshuffle also included a reconfiguration of the provincial government's portfolios, as safety was merged with roads and transport, finance was split from economic development, and tourism was split from agriculture to merge with economic development. On 10 May 2007, Molewa announced a second reshuffle, to take effect from 1 June; it affected only three portfolios and again involved no dismissals. In July 2007, Elliot Mayisela was removed as MEC for Agriculture – a controversial decision which he contested – and was replaced in an acting capacity by Darkie Afrika, who also remained Economic Development MEC.

Modiselle premiership: 2009–2010 
Maureen Modiselle took office as Premier after the 2009 general election and announced her new Executive Council on 8 May 2009, with some adjustments to the configuration of portfolios. The entire Executive Council remained in office throughout Modiselle's brief tenure in office, with one exception: on 16 August 2010, Modiselle sacked Grace Pampiri-Bothman, the MEC for Sports, Arts and Culture, "for defiance and showing disrespect and disdain" to the office of the Premier. The MEC for Finance, Louisa Mabe, took on Pampiri-Bothman's portfolio in an acting capacity.

Modise premiership: 2010–2014 
In November 2010, Thandi Modise was sworn in as Premier, after the ANC asked the incumbent, Maureen Modiselle, to resign; a week later, on 25 November 2010, she announced a major reshuffle of the Executive Council, firing five of Modiselle's MECs and filling an existing vacancy in the sports, arts and culture portfolio. She also reconfigured several portfolios, including by removing the social development portfolio from its earlier location in the health ministry and merging it with the new portfolio of women, children and people with disabilities. On 3 May 2012, she announced another major reshuffle, in which three MECs were fired and others changed portfolios; only two MECs were retained in the same positions (Magome Masike as MEC for Health and Mosetsanagape Mokomele-Mothibi as MEC for Social Development, Women, Children and People with Disabilities). 

On 27 June 2013, Modise fired and replaced three MECs who had been implicated in misconduct: Louisa Mabe, then MEC for Education and Training, had been implicated in procurement irregularities; China Dodovu, who had been appointed MEC for Local Government and Traditional Affairs in 2012, was facing a conspiracy to murder charge; and Social Development MEC Mosetsanagape Mokomele-Mothibi was being investigated for abusing the privileges of her office. Modise said that none of the fired MECs had been found guilty of wrongdoing but that their removal was "aimed at faster delivery and eliminating the need for us to answer for hang-ups".

Mahumapelo premiership: 2014–2018 
Pursuant to the May 2014 general election, Supra Mahumapelo was elected Premier of the North West and announced his Executive Council. Ontlametse Mochware was appointed MEC for Social Development but resigned almost immediately due to a legal technicality; she was replaced by Fenny Gaolaolwe.

On 8 May 2016, Mahumapelo announced a reshuffle in which he sacked two MECs – Gaoage Saliva Molapisi and Wendy Matsemela – and filled two vacancies, one left by the resignation of Collen Maine after his election as ANC Youth League President in 2015, and the other left by the resignation of Tebogo Modise, who became Mayor of Ratlou Local Municipality after the 2016 local government elections. On 8 August 2017, he announced appointments to fill two further vacancies: Public Works and Roads MEC Madoda Sambatha had been sacked in June of that year amid a land sale controversy, while Social Development MEC Kgakgamatso Nkewu had died in a car accident in July 2016.

Mokgoro premiership

First term: 2018–2019 
Job Mokgoro was sworn in as Premier in June 2018 after Supra Mahumapelo was forced to resign; he preserved the composition of Mahumapelo's Executive Council until 6 December 2018, when he announced a reshuffle in which four MECs were fired and several others changed portfolios.

Second term: 2019–2021 
Mokgoro was elected to his first full term as Premier in the 2019 general election and announced his new Executive Council on 28 May 2019, including reconfigurations of several portfolios. Mmoloki Cwaile was appointed MEC for Cooperative Governance, Human Settlements and Traditional Affairs in November 2020 following the death of the incumbent, Gordon Kegakilwe, from COVID-19-related illness; however, Cwaile was sacked in August 2021 and replaced by Lenah Miga.

Maape premiership: 2021–present 
In September 2021, Bushy Maape was sworn in to replace Job Mokgoro as Premier. Maape initially preserved Mokgoro's Executive Council, but on 21 November 2022 he announced a reshuffle in which Lenah Miga was fired and replaced by Nono Maloyi, while Kenetswe Mosenogi and Tsotso Tlhapi swopped portfolios. On 7 December that year, Viola Motsumi replaced Wendy Matsemela as MEC for Education.

References 

Government of North West (South African province)